Sylvie Borda (born September 4   1966 at Pointe-à-Pitre) is a French athlete, who specialises in the triple jump.

Biography  
She won seven  champion of France titles for the triple jump   Three outdoor in 1990, 1992 and 1999, and four indoors in 1992, 1993, 1996 and 1998. In 1993 she also became the Indoors champion of France  for the Long jump.

She is the first to hold the French record for the triple jump jumping 13.12m on July 29, 1990, at Blois. She improved this record a year later at Dijon with a jump of 13.18m.

prize list  
 French Championships in Athletics   :  
 winner of the triple jump 1990,  1992 and 1999      
 French Athletics Championships Indoors   :  
 winner of the triple jump 1992,  1993,  1996 and 1998   
 winner of the long jump 1993

Records

notes and references  
 Docathlé2003, Fédération française d'athlétisme, 2003, p. 392

1966 births
Living people
French female long jumpers
French female triple jumpers